DJ-Kicks: Kruder & Dorfmeister  is a DJ mix album, mixed by Kruder & Dorfmeister. It was released on 19 August 1996 on the Studio !K7 independent record label as part of the DJ-Kicks series.

Track listing
  The Herbaliser - A Mother
  Small World - Livin' Free
  Tango - Spellbound
  The Lab Rats - Give My Soul
  Statik Sound System - Revolutionary Pilot
  JMJ & Flytronix - In Too Deep
  Aquasky - Kauna
  James Bong - Never Say?
  Hardfloor pres. Dadamnphreaknoizphunk? - Dubdope
  Thievery Corporation - Shaolin Satellite
  Kruder & Dorfmeister - High Noon
  Beanfield - Keep On Believing
  Sapien - Que Dolor
  Shantel - Bass and Several Cars
  Karma - Look Up Dere
  Showroom Recordings - Radio Burning Chrome
  Kruder & Dorfmeister - Black Baby (DJ-Kicks)

Sales

References 

 Official Website
 DJ-Kicks website

Kruder and Dorfmeister
Kruder & Dorfmeister albums
1996 compilation albums